Symonds Yat Rapids are a grade-2 man-made feature on the River Wye, near Symonds Yat on the Gloucestershire and Herefordshire border. They are most commonly used by canoeists and kayakers for whitewater training and playboating.

Construction
Man-made rock walls have been installed to modify the flow of the river on river right, and provide waves and eddies.

Ownership and access
The British Canoe Union (now called British Canoeing) purchased the banks to the river in 2003 allowing year-round access.

Typically the mid-autumn and mid-spring periods provide the best levels. After very heavy rain the features will wash out leaving nothing more than fast-flowing water.

See also
 River running
 River Severn

References

External links
 Symonds Yat Rapids Preservation Group 
 Symonds Yat East 

Canoeing and kayaking venues in the United Kingdom
River Wye
Sports venues in Gloucestershire